Omagh Academicals RFC is a Northern Irish rugby football club from Omagh, County Tyrone, playing in Division 2C of the All-Ireland League.

History
Omagh Academicals RFC were formed in 1952, drawing many of its players from past pupils of Omagh Academy, where the club also draws its name from. 

The club occupies a 4 pitch site in the North Omagh, just off the Beltany Road, as well as having a large clubhouse and on-site gym.

Omagh field 4 Men’s teams on a weekly basis, as well as a Women’s side, and various youth and mini’s teams. The 1st XV were first promoted to the All-Ireland League in 1996, but were relegated in 2000, before winning promotion again in 2017. The club currently plays in Division 2C of the AIL.

Honours
Ulster Towns Cup: 1
 2001-02
Ulster Junior Cup: 4
 1981-82, 1982–83, 1992-83

External links
Club web site

References

Rugby union clubs in County Tyrone
Senior Irish rugby clubs (Ulster)